Grue Idrettslag is a Norwegian sports club from Grue, founded in 1906. It has sections for association football, team handball, athletics, orienteering, sport shooting and Nordic skiing.

Football
The men's football team currently play in the 5. divisjon, the sixth tier of Norwegian football. The team played in the 3. divisjon from 2014, the fourth tier of Norwegian football. The team last played on this tier in 2007. Before that long Third Division stint, Grue played in the 2. divisjon until 1994. In 1976 and 1977 the team even played on the second tier. The club's greatest player throughout its history is Ståle Solbakken.

Recent seasons
{|class="wikitable"
|-bgcolor="#efefef"
! Season
! 
! Pos.
! Pl.
! W
! D
! L
! GS
! GA
! P
!Cup
!Notes
|-
|2010
|4. divisjon, gr. 3
|align=right |3
|align=right|22||align=right|17||align=right|1||align=right|4
|align=right|92||align=right|38||align=right|52
||
|
|-
|2011
|4. divisjon, gr. 3
|align=right |3
|align=right|20||align=right|12||align=right|4||align=right|4
|align=right|57||align=right|36||align=right|40
||dnq
|
|-
|2012
|4. divisjon, gr. 3
|align=right| 2
|align=right|20||align=right|17||align=right|0||align=right|3
|align=right|57||align=right|24||align=right|51
||dnq
|
|-
|2013
|4. divisjon, gr. 3
|align=right bgcolor=#DDFFDD| 1
|align=right|22||align=right|18||align=right|2||align=right|2
|align=right|101||align=right|25||align=right|56
||dnq
|Promoted to 3. divisjon
|-
|2014 
|3. divisjon, gr. 3
|align=right |6
|align=right|26||align=right|10||align=right|8||align=right|8
|align=right|46||align=right|53||align=right|38
||1st round
|
|-
|2015 
|3. divisjon, gr. 2
|align=right bgcolor="#FFCCCC" | 14
|align=right|26||align=right|1||align=right|2||align=right|23
|align=right|15||align=right|113||align=right|5
||dnq
| Relegated to 4. divisjon
|-
|2016
|4. divisjon, gr. 3
|align=right bgcolor="#FFCCCC" | 9
|align=right|22||align=right|5||align=right|4||align=right|13
|align=right|30||align=right|63||align=right|19
||1st round
|Relegated to 5. divisjon
|-
|2017
|5. divisjon, gr. 2
|align=right |3
|align=right|23||align=right|15||align=right|3||align=right|5
|align=right|63||align=right|34||align=right|48
||dnq
|
|-
|2018 
|5. divisjon, gr. 2
|align=right |2
|align=right|18||align=right|12||align=right|3||align=right|3
|align=right|64||align=right|19||align=right|39
||dnq
|
|}

Athletics
The club has had a few national champions in athletics. Grete Gjermshus won the shot put in 1988 and 1989, after several silver and bronze medals earlier. In 1946 Thorvald Wilhelmsen won both 5000 and 10,000 metres; he had previously represented the neighbors Grue Finnskog IL. The club also became Norwegian champion in the 4 x 100 metres relay in 1936.

References

External links
 Official site (football) 
 Official site (skiing) 
 Official site (athletics) 
 Official site (orienteering) 

Football clubs in Norway
Athletics clubs in Norway
Orienteering clubs in Norway
Sport in Hedmark
Grue, Norway
Sports clubs established in 1906
1906 establishments in Norway